Athletische Sportvereniging Oostende Koninklijke Maatschappij was a Belgian football club from the city of Ostend, West Flanders until its fusion with VGO Oostende to form K.V. Oostende in 1981.

History
It was founded in 1911 as Association Sportive Ostendaise (in French).  Eleven years later it took part to the second division until 1926 when it was decided to reduce the number of leagues at that level from two to one.  The club had finished 9th on 14 in its league that season while only the first 7 clubs were admitted to the next second division season.  In 1931 two leagues were held again and the club was admitted to the second division where it remained until the promotion to the first division in 1969.  At the end of the 1970–71 season, A.S.V. Oostende K.M. (as it was known since 1947) was relegated to the third division following two awful years for the club.  But in 1973 and in 1974 Oostende promoted twice and was thus back at the top level.  The highest position reached by the club was the 12th in 1976.  In 1981 the club disappeared following the merge with the matricule n°31.

References
 Belgian football clubs history
 RSSSF Archive – 1st and 2nd division final tables

Association football clubs established in 1911
Defunct football clubs in Belgium
Association football clubs disestablished in 1981
1911 establishments in Belgium
1981 disestablishments in Belgium
Organisations based in Belgium with royal patronage
A.S.V. Oostende K.M.
Belgian Pro League clubs